The New Pornographers are a Canadian indie rock band, formed in 1997 in Vancouver. Presented as a musical collective and supergroup of singer-songwriters and musicians from multiple projects, the band has released eight studio albums to date. The band have received critical acclaim for their use of multiple vocalists and songwriters, as well as for the elements of power pop incorporated into their music. Pitchfork has described the band's sound as "peppy, gleeful, headstrong guitar pop", while Stereogum has retrospectively praised the band's debut album Mass Romantic as "one of the greatest and most immediate power pop albums ever rendered".

History
The New Pornographers' name was chosen by Carl Newman, who has said that he came up with it after watching a Japanese film called The Pornographers.  The band has released eight albums to date: Mass Romantic (2000), Electric Version (2003), Twin Cinema (2005), Challengers (2007), Together (2010), Brill Bruisers (2014), Whiteout Conditions (2017), and In the Morse Code of Brake Lights (2019). A live album recorded on their 2006 tour is available only at concerts and on the band's website. In 2005, the band was the subject of Reginald Harkema's documentary film Better Off in Bed.

The New Pornographers' first four albums each placed in the top 40 on The Village Voices Pazz & Jop year-end poll of hundreds of music reviewers. From 2000 to 2006, either a New Pornographers' album or a solo album from one of the band's members ranked in the top 40 on the list each year. In 2007, Blender magazine ranked the New Pornographers' first album, Mass Romantic, the 24th best indie album of all time. In 2009, Rolling Stone magazine ranked the band's second studio album, Electric Version, No. 79 in the "100 Best Albums of the Decade".

All of the New Pornographers' original members were prominent within the Vancouver music scene prior to forming the band. Kathryn Calder, who is also Newman's niece, joined the band in 2005 largely as a live replacement for Neko Case, whose solo career often left her unavailable to perform with the band. Calder's first lead vocals for the band were on 2007's Challengers, singing the lead on "Failsafe" and sharing the lead with Newman on "Adventures in Solitude".

In 2009, the New Pornographers contributed a cover of the Destroyer song "Hey, Snow White" to the AIDS benefit album Dark Was the Night, produced by the Red Hot Organization. The band released their fifth album, Together, on May 4, 2010, on Matador Records. The album includes collaborations from St. Vincent, Beirut's Zach Condon, and Okkervil River's Will Sheff.

In 2012, the New Pornographers contributed a cover of the song "Think About Me" for the Fleetwood Mac tribute CD called Just Tell Me That You Want Me released by Hear Music. The band's sixth album, Brill Bruisers, was released on August 26, 2014. The album was their highest charting to date in the United States, peaking at #13 on the Billboard 200.

On January 26, 2017, the New Pornographers announced their seventh album, Whiteout Conditions, would be released on April 7. The album was preceded by the single "High Ticket Attractions". The album is the first to feature drummer Joe Seiders as a full-time member after replacing drummer Kurt Dahle in mid-2014. It is also the first New Pornographers album to not feature Dan Bejar. Newman, however, went on the record to note that Bejar's absence did not mean he had left the band entirely; telling Stereogum:

On November 29, 2018, A.C. Newman announced via Twitter that he had begun work on a future New Pornographers album. On August 2, 2019, the band announced via Twitter that it would release its new album, In the Morse Code of Brake Lights, on September 27, and released its first single from the album, "Falling Down the Stairs of Your Smile". In a press release for the album, Dan Bejar is described as a "former (and possibly future) member" of the band. The new press photos for the band include vocalist/violinist Simi Stone, officially inducting her into the band after being an auxiliary touring member since 2015.

In July 2021, the band announced a North American tour where they would play Mass Romantic and Twin Cinema in full across simultaneous nights, as well as a reissue of Mass Romantic on vinyl. This announcement also confirmed the return of Bejar to the band, as well as the departure of both Thurier and Stone.

On January 9, 2023, A.C. Newman announced via Twitter that the band had moved to a new label, Merge Records, alongside announcing the band's new album Continue as a Guest, a new single from the album "Really Really Light" and a new tour starting in April. The band's new press photos confirmed Bejar's second departure from the group – although he has a co-writing credit on "Really Really Light".

Members

Current members
Members' other projects in brackets

Neko Case – vocals (solo artist, also of Maow, the Corn Sisters, and Cub) (1997–present)
John Collins – bass (the Evaporators and Destroyer) (1997–present)
Carl Newman – vocals, guitar (solo artist (as A.C. Newman), also of Superconductor and Zumpano) (1997–present)
Todd Fancey – lead guitar (solo artist (as Fancey) and of Limblifter) (2003–present)
Kathryn Calder – vocals, keyboards, guitar (solo artist and of Immaculate Machine and Frontperson) (2005–present)
Joe Seiders – drums, vocals (Beat Club) (2014–present)

Current touring musicians
Nora O'Connor – backing vocals, percussion (The Flat Five) (2021–present)

Former members
Fisher Rose – drums (Destroyer and A.C. Newman) (1997–1999)
Kurt Dahle – drums, vocals (Limblifter and the Age of Electric) (1999–2014)
Simi Stone – violin, vocals, percussion (solo artist and of Suffrajett) (2019–2021; touring member 2015–2019)
Blaine Thurier – keyboards, synthesizer (independent filmmaker) (1997–2021)
Dan Bejar – vocals, guitar (Destroyer, Swan Lake, and Hello, Blue Roses) (1997–2017, 2021–2022)

Former touring musicians
Lindsay "Coco" Hames – vocals, percussion, acoustic guitar (the Ettes) (2014)

Timeline

Discography

Studio albums

Live albums
 Live Session (iTunes Exclusive) (2005)
 Live! (2006)
 LIVE from SoHo (iTunes Exclusive) (2008)

Singles

Contributions with non-LP songs
FUBAR: The Album (2002) – "Your Daddy Don't Know"
Matador at Fifteen (2004) – "Graceland"
Dark Was the Night (2009) – "Hey, Snow White"
Burn Notice: The Fall of Sam Axe (2011) - "Hey, Snow White"
Just Tell Me That You Want Me: A Tribute to Fleetwood Mac (2012) – "Think About Me"

Other Contributions
Queer as Folk (2000) – "Mass Romantic"
Jay and Silent Bob Strike Back (2001) – "Letter from an Occupant"
Men with Brooms (2002) – "Mass Romantic"
CBC Radio 3 Sessions, Vol. 1 (2004) – "The Fake Headlines"
Prom Queen: The Marc Hall Story (2004) – "Mass Romantic"
The Office (Season 2, Episode 7: "The Client") (2005) – "Use It"
Weeds (2005) – "The Laws Have Changed"
Waiting... (2005) – "Electric Version"
Gilmore Girls (2004) – "The Laws Have Changed"
Gilmore Girls (2005) – "Twin Cinema"
The Hour (Main Title Theme Season 3) (2006) – "Use It"
Chuck (Season 1, Episode 2: "Chuck Versus the Helicopter") (2007) – "Challengers"
Heroes (Season 2, Episode 6: "The Line") (2007) – "All for Swinging You Around"
Rock Band (2007) – "Electric Version", "Use It", "All of the Things That Go to Make Heaven and Earth" (DLC)
University of Phoenix commercial (2007) – "Bleeding Heart Show"
Stone of Destiny (2008) – "Mutiny, I Promise You"
NBA playoffs (2008) – "Use It"
Numb3rs (2008) – "Challengers"
Secret Diary of a Call Girl (Series 2, Episode 2) (2008) – "Adventures in Solitude"
Management (2009) – "Adventures in Solitude", "All the Old Showstoppers"
Ugly Betty (2010) – "Adventures in Solitude"
The Good Wife (Season 2, Episode 13) (2011) – "Testament to Youth in Verse"
 Amazon Kindle commercial – "Sweet Talk, Sweet Talk"
T-Mobile commercial (2011) – "Moves"
 Hyundai commercial (Canada) – "Moves"
Go On (opening credits) (2012) – "Moves"
Between (Season 1, Episode 1) (2015) – "Moves"
Speechless (Season 1, Episode 22: "M-A-- MAY-JAY") (2017) – "Dancehall Domine"
Blindspot (Season 3, Episode 1) – "The Bleeding Heart Show"
Daybreak (Season 1, Episode 9) – "Adventures in Solitude"

See also

Canadian rock
List of bands from British Columbia
Music of Vancouver

References

External links

Official site
Matador Records label website

Musical groups established in 1999
Canadian indie rock groups
Canadian indie pop groups
Musical collectives
Musical groups from Vancouver
Matador Records artists
Canadian power pop groups
Mint Records artists
Rock music supergroups
1999 establishments in British Columbia
Juno Award for Alternative Album of the Year winners
Concord Records artists